The 2022–23 season is Stoke City's 106th season in the Football League, the 46th in the second tier and ninth in the Championship.

Pre-season and friendlies
In February 2022 Stoke announced a five-year multi-million pound refurbishment programme for the bet365 Stadium and the Clayton Wood Training Ground beginning in the summer of 2022 with the replacement of 8,400 seats in the Franklyn Stand and regeneration of The Players' Lounge and Delilah’s Bar. Leaving the club in the transfer window were Benik Afobe, Joe Allen, James Chester, Alfie Doughty, Steven Fletcher, Tom Ince, Christian Norton, Tashan Oakley-Boothe, Tommy Smith and Mario Vrančić. Whilst coming into the team were Harry Clarke, Aden Flint, Dwight Gayle, Gavin Kilkenny, Josh Laurent, Liam McCarron and Will Smallbone.

The squad returned to Clayton Wood for pre-season training on 20 June and played a behind closed doors match against Leeds United on 2 July, they then spent a week at a training camp in Cork, Ireland. On 9 July Stoke beat League of Ireland First Division side Cork City 2–0 at Turners Cross. City then faced three League One teams, losing 2–0 to Accrington Stanley and Bristol Rovers whilst drawing 1–1 with Fleetwood Town. Stoke ended an unimpressive pre-season with a 2–1 defeat at Heart of Midlothian.

Championship

July & August
Stoke lost their opening game 2–0 away at Millwall with both of the Lions' goals coming from unmarked Charlie Cresswell headers. The first home game of the season was won 2–0 against Blackpool with goals from Harry Clarke and Jacob Brown. After exiting the EFL Cup City suffered a 3–1 defeat at Huddersfield Town with Lewis Baker missing a first half penalty. City were second-best against Middlesbrough and looked to be heading for a 2–1 defeat before a late header from D'Margio Wright-Phillips earned Stoke a fortunate 2–2 draw. Stoke's poor start to the season continued as they lost 1–0 at home to newly promoted Sunderland on 20 August. O'Neill was then sacked by the club four days later. The next day Stoke were given permisson by Sunderland to speak to Alex Neil. Dean Holden took caretaker charge of the match against Blackburn Rovers as a long range goal from Baker earned Stoke their first away win of the season. On 28 August Alex Neil was appointed manager on a three-year contract. Neil's first match in charge was at home against Swansea City. Swansea took and early lead through Joël Piroe and after wasteful finishing Stoke finally equalised in stoppage time through Tyrese Campbell.

September
On transfer deadline day Stoke brought in right-back Dujon Sterling on a season-long loan from Chelsea. Stoke lost 2–1 at Reading with both the Royals goals coming from defensive errors. After the match Neil was critical of his sides lack of fitness. The team responded with a comfortable 3–0 victory at Hull City with a brace from Baker. They ended September with a goalless draw away at Queens Park Rangers.

October
After the international break Stoke were out-played by Watford, losing 4–0, their heaviest home defeat for five years. Three-days later a late header from Harry Clarke earned Stoke a 1–1 draw away at Burnley. Stoke then beat the early league leaders, Sheffield United 3–1 with goals from Wilmot, Phil Jagielka and a first professional league goal from Liam Delap. City put in a commanding away performance at Preston North End, winning 2–0 with goals from Campbell and Will Smallbone. They then lost 1–0 at home against Rotherham United despite having 29 shots at goal. Stoke lost to Coventry in a similar manner, controlling possession but failing to create any meaningful chances and were hit twice on the counter-attack. They ended October with a third straight defeat, going down 3–1 at Norwich.

November
Stoke beat Wigan Athletic 1–0 on 2 November, with a goal from Josh Tymon on his return from Injury. They then lost a third straight home match 2–1 against Birmingham. Three days later they ended that run with a 2–0 victory against Luton Town with early goals from Powell and an own goal from Tom Lockyer, The game also marked Harry Souttar's return from injury after a year out. Stoke put in a poor performance against West Brom, losing 2–0 before the season took a four week break due to the 2022 FIFA World Cup.

December
During the break Stoke went on a warm weather training camp in Dubai and played a friendly against Nottingham Forest at Loughborough University, winning 2–1. Stoke returned to Championship football on 10 December with a home match against Cardiff City. Ryan Wintle scored early on for the Bluebirds but two quick goals from Campbell and Delap put Stoke into a 2–1 lead but a late goal from Callum Robinson earned Cardiff a point. The following week Stoke came from behind to beat Bristol City 2–1 at Ashton Gate. On Boxing Day, Stoke came from behind twice to draw 2–2 with Rotherham United. Stoke ended 2022 with a home defeat against league leaders Burnley, Josh Cullen scoring the only goal.

January
Stoke began 2023 with a home clash against Preston North End. Ched Evans scored the only goal of a poor quality game in second half injury time. Neil decided to let first team coach and club legend Rory Delap leave the club and also ended the loan of his son Liam Delap. On 14 January, Joe Bursik joined Belgian side Club Brugge and later on Stoke went on to lose 3–1 to promotion chasing Sheffield United. Loanees Harry Clarke and Tariqe Fosu both returned to their parent clubs before Stoke ended a run of three successive defeats with an emphatic 4–0 win over Reading. Neil added more loan players to his squad, goalkeeper Matija Sarkic, defenders Ki-Jana Hoever and Axel Tuanzebe, midfielders Bersant Celina and Ben Pearson whilst Harry Souttar completed a £15 million move to Leicester City.

February
New signings Celina and Sarkic made their first league start away at in-form Luton Town as Pelly Ruddock Mpanzu scored the only goal of the game, this was followed by a drab goalless draw against Hull City. Stoke then took on bottom of the table Huddersfield Town, winning 3–0 with goals from Jagielka, Brown and late penalty from Baker whilst the Terriers had Will Boyle sent-off for two bookable offences. Stoke lost 1–0 to another bottom of the table side Blackpool, Ian Poveda scoring the only goal in the seventh minute. They made amends two-days later beating Swansea City 3–1 with Josh Laurent scoring his first goals for the club. Stoke ended February with 1–0 defeat against play-off chasing Millwall, Zian Flemming scoring the only goal early into the match.

March
Neil made his first return to Sunderland on 4 March where he was given a hostile reception. His team won easily, beating the Black Cats 5–1 with a brace from both Campbell and Gayle.

Results

League table

FA Cup

Stoke City were drawn away at EFL League Two side Hartlepool United in the third Round, winning 3–0 with Hartlepool scoring two own goals and 3–1 at home to Stevenage in the fourth round. Premier League side Brighton & Hove Albion were the visitors in the fifth round, winning 1–0 with a first half strike from Evan Ferguson.

EFL Cup

Stoke were drawn away to Morecambe in the first round, and they lost 5–3 on penalties following a goalless draw.

Squad statistics

Transfers

In

Out

Loans in

Loans out

References

Stoke City F.C.
Stoke City F.C. seasons
English football clubs 2022–23 season